The 2016–17 Kent State Golden Flashes women's basketball team represented Kent State University during the 2016–17 NCAA Division I women's basketball season. The Golden Flashes, led by first year head coach Todd Starkey, played their home games at the Memorial Athletic and Convocation Center, also known as the MAC Center, as members of the East Division of the Mid-American Conference. After finishing the 2015–16 season with an overall record of 6–23 and 3–15 in MAC play, the Flashes finished the 2016–17 regular season with a 19–11 overall record and 13–5 in MAC play. They won their first East division title since 2005, clinching a share on March 1 and winning it outright on March 4.

Schedule

|-
!colspan=9 style="background:#F7BD0A; color:#131149;"| Non-conference regular season

|-
!colspan=9 style="background:#F7BD0A; color:#131149;"| MAC regular season

|-
!colspan=9 style="background:#F7BD0A; color:#131149;"| MAC Tournament

|-
!colspan=9 style="background:#F7BD0A; color:#131149;"| WNIT

See also
 2016–17 Kent State Golden Flashes men's basketball team

References

Kent State
Kent State Golden Flashes women's basketball seasons
2017 Women's National Invitation Tournament participants
Kent State
Kent State